Fengyuan District is a district located in north-central Taichung, Taiwan on the south bank of the Dajia River. Fengyuan district is the third most populated district among former Taichung County, ranking after Dali and Taiping district. Fengyuan was recognized as Huludun in early times, meaning "gourd" in Chinese, for a gourd-shape pile of mud that was found in Fengyuan by the aborigines. The rice produced in Fengyuan is famous for its high quality and the bakery industry prospered in later decades. Because of its location of the intersection of Taiwan Railways Administration Western Trunk line and Dongshi branch line, Fengyuan quickly expanded after World War II. It soon became one of the regions with great economic and cultural development in central Taiwan. After the merger of Taichung City and Taichung County in 2010, population and economic growth slowed slightly. so recently, fengyuan faces the challenge of being marginalized .

History 
Before the arrival of the Han Chinese, the area of that is now Fengyuan was inhabited by Taiwanese aborigines. Before the mid-18th century, the area was a territory of the Pazeh people, which they called Haluton. This name was adapted into Hokkien as Haloton.

Han immigration to the area began during late Qing rule. Liu Mingchuan gave the area a nickname of "little Suzhou" due to its prosperity and scenic beauty.

Empire of Japan
In 1905, during Japanese rule, the Holotun Station was erected, putting the area along a main thoroughfare. In 1920, the Governor-General of Taiwan gave the town its name, meaning flourishing plain. Emperor Meiji, Emperor Taishō, and Emperor Hirohito ate rice supplied from Toyohara.

After World War II
After World War II in 1945, the area was renamed to Fengyuan and was organized as an urban township of Taichung County. In 1950, it was made the capital of the county from the former capital Yuanlin after the separation of Changhua County and Nantou County from Taichung County. On 1 March 1976, Fengyuan was upgraded to a county-administered city due to its population. On 25 December 2010, Taichung County was merged with Taichung City and Fengyuan was upgraded to a district of the city with Xitun District as the capital of the city.

Administrative divisions 
Fengyuan, Fengrong, Dingjie, Zhongshan, Xiajie, Zhongyang, Danan, Beinan, Tungnan, Xinan, Fengxi, Zunliao, Fengzun, Fuchun, Hulu, Xian, Xishi, Zhongxing, Shepi, Sancun, Tungshi, Minsheng, Tianxin, Fengtian, Liancun, Yangming, Nanyang, Beiyang, Tungyang, Nancun, Nantian, Nansong, Wengming, Wengzi, Wengshe and Pozi Village.

Tourism 
 Fengyuan Museum of Lacquer Art
 Taichung Municipal City Huludun Cultural Center
 Fengyuan Golf Course
 Houfeng Bikeway
 Huludun Park

Miaodong Night Market 
In the 1970s, citizens created the Miaodong Night Market, that is full of Taiwanese street foods.

Economy 
The restaurant chain KLG has its headquarters in Fengyuan District.

Industrial products 
 Athletic shoe

Transportation

Rail 

Fengyuan District is accessible from TRA Fengyuan Station.

Road 

 National Highway No. 1
 National Highway No. 4

Notable natives 
 Chang Yu-sheng, pop singer
 Johnny Chiang, Chairperson of Kuomintang
 Kuan Bi-ling, member of Legislative Yuan (2008–2020)
 Lin Chung-chiu, baseball player
 Liu Fu-hao, baseball player
 Tu Ai-yu, golfer
 Winnie Hsin, pop singer

References

External links 

  

Districts of Taichung